Leaf River, or Leafriver, is a ghost town in section 22 of Leaf River Township, Wadena County, Minnesota, United States.Today the town has a population around 50. There is a restaurant, a golf course, an old school house and a residential community.

History
The village of Leaf River had a post office from 1880 until 1882, and again from 1902 until 1908.  It was served by a station of the Great Northern Railway.

Etymology
The village received its name from the Leaf River, which was in turn named for the Leaf Mountains, which were called by the Ojibwa Gaaskibag-wajiwan.  This name was translated by Gilfillan as "Rustling Leaf Mountains."

Notes

Ghost towns in Minnesota
Former populated places in Wadena County, Minnesota